Iraj Mesdaghi (Persian: ایرج مصداقی; born 1960) is an Iranian writer and human rights activist. He has lived in Stockholm, Sweden since 1994. He supported the People's Mujahedin of Iran before becoming one of its critics. Mesdaghi has written several books and articles on the 1988 mass executions of political prisoners in Iran.

Biography 
Mesdaghi was born in 1960 in Tehran, Iran. As a teenager, he traveled to the United States to work with the Confederation of Iranian Students to revive the student movement unit. He returned to Iran after the Iranian revolution. He was imprisoned in the Ghazelhasar, Evin and Gohardasht prisons for over 10 years, from 1981 to 1991, on charges of supporting the PMOI Organization.

While in prison, Mesdaghi survived the 1988 mass executions of political prisoners in Iran. After being released, he was forced to flee from Iran to Sweden in 1994. In Sweden, he continued his work advancing human rights in Iran through work with the UN Human Rights Council, the International Labor Organization, and the European Parliament. He is currently independently engaged in political activity and research.

Mesdaghi is also a member of the "Committee for the Observation and Use of Iranian Justice Data", headed by Nobel Peace Prize winner Shirin Ebadi. The Committee helped verify information in a leaked file from the Iranian Judiciary which revealed the extent of the governments political arrests, imprisonments, and executions from 1978 to 2009.

Cinematic presence 
Mesdaghi was featured prominently in the documentaryThose Who Said No, directed by Nima Sarvestani. The film documents an international investigation of mass executions of political prisoners in Iran in the 1980s. It was shown at the IDFA.

Bibliography 
Neither Life Nor Death (Persian: نه زیستن نه مرگ)
Bar Saghe Tabideh Kanaf (Persian: برساقه تابیده کنف)
Torture in the Name of Allah (Persian: دوزخ روی زمین)
violation of fundamental rights of labour in iran (Persian: نگاهی به سازمان بین‌المللی کار و نقض حقوق بنیادین کار در ایران)
Negahi Ba Cheshme Jan (Persian: نگاهی با چشم جان)
Raghse Ghoughounosha va Avaze khakestar (Persian: رقص ققنوس‌ها و آواز خاکستر)
United Nations and violation of Human Rights in Iran (Persian: سازمان ملل متحد و نقض حقوق بشر در ایران)

Despite publishing books, Iraj Mesdaghi has published hundreds of articles and reports on human rights and disclosure against Islamic Republic policies.

References

External links
 Iraj Mesdaghi on IMDb
 Official website

Prisoners and detainees of Iran
Iranian human rights activists
Iranian expatriates in Sweden
1960 births
Living people